William Michael Smith (born July 10, 1989) is an American professional baseball pitcher for the Texas Rangers of Major League Baseball (MLB). He has previously played in MLB for the Kansas City Royals, Milwaukee Brewers, San Francisco Giants, Atlanta Braves, and Houston Astros.

Smith played college baseball at Gulf Coast Community College, and was selected by the Los Angeles Angels of Anaheim in the seventh round of the 2008 MLB draft. He made his MLB debut in 2012 as a member of Royals. Smith was an MLB All-Star in 2019.

In the 2021 postseason, Smith made 11 appearances, successfully completing each without surrendering any runs.  In the 2021 World Series, he closed out Game 6 and Atlanta defeated Houston to clinch the title.  Smith had a 2–0 win–loss record with six saves.

Amateur career
Smith attended Northgate High School in Newnan, Georgia, where he played for the school's baseball team as a pitcher. He enrolled at Gulf Coast Community College in Panama City, Florida, where he continued his baseball career. After his freshman year at Gulf Coast, the Los Angeles Angels of Anaheim selected Smith in the seventh round, with the 229th overall selection, of the 2008 Major League Baseball Draft.

Professional career

Minor leagues
Making his professional debut with the Orem Owlz of the Rookie-level Pioneer League, Smith recorded 76 strikeouts while walking only six batters. He pitched for the Cedar Rapids Kernels of the Class A Midwest League in 2009, and the Rancho Cucamonga Quakes of the Class A-Advanced California League in 2010. On July 23, 2010, the Angels traded Smith along with Sean O'Sullivan to the Kansas City Royals for Alberto Callaspo.

Pitching for the Northwest Arkansas Naturals of the Class AA Texas League in 2011, Smith and Kelvin Herrera combined to pitch a no-hitter on July 19, with Smith pitching the first seven innings. Smith began the 2012 season with the Omaha Storm Chasers of the Class AAA Pacific Coast League.

Kansas City Royals
The Royals promoted Smith to the majors for the first time on May 22, 2012. By the end of the 2012 season, Smith had made 16 starts, his record was 6–9 with a 5.32 ERA. During the 2013 season, the Royals transitioned Smith into a relief pitcher. He spent the majority of the season at Omaha. He was called up multiple times to the Royals bullpen while also making a spot start.

Milwaukee Brewers
Smith was traded to the Milwaukee Brewers in exchange for Norichika Aoki on December 5, 2013. Smith had a 1–3 win–loss record and a 3.70 earned run average (ERA) in 2014. In the May 22nd game against the Atlanta Braves, Smith was sent to pitch in relief of Brandon Kintzler in a botched double switch despite Smith not having warmed up in the bullpen. Smith ended up pitching with only eight warmup pitches from the mound and gave up the go-ahead run in the same inning.

On May 21, 2015, he was ejected from a game vs the Atlanta Braves for having a foreign substance on his right arm. He was suspended for eight games, pending his appeal and his suspension was subsequently reduced to six games. Smith had a 7–2 win–loss record and a 2.70 ERA in 2015.

During spring training in 2016, Smith tore the lateral collateral ligament in his knee. He returned to the Brewers on June 2. By the end of the month of July, Smith had appeared in 27 games for Milwaukee, serving as the set-up man. He had 1–3 win–loss record and a 3.68 earned run average (ERA) in those 27 appearances.

San Francisco Giants
On August 1, 2016, the Brewers traded Smith to the San Francisco Giants for Phil Bickford and Andrew Susac. He made 26 appearances with the Giants, finishing with a 1–1 win–loss record and a 2.95 earned run average (ERA).

On March 20, 2017, Smith was diagnosed with possible UCL damage in his left elbow, but no structural damage. He returned to California to seek second opinions with doctors, who petitioned that Smith would require surgery. On March 24, it was reported that Smith elected to have Tommy John surgery on his elbow, ending his 2017 season with the Giants.

In 2018, he returned to action in mid-season and was used as a setup man and the closer. He appeared in 54 games, finishing with a 2–3 win–loss record and a 2.55 earned run average (ERA) to go along with 14 saves (14/18 in save opportunities).

In 2019, Smith was named the Giants' closer. He was selected to the All Star Game in 2019 after he converted 23 of 23 save opportunities in the first half of the season. For the season, he was 6–0 with 34 saves (3rd in the NL) and a 2.76 ERA, and 96 strikeouts in 65.1 innings.

Atlanta Braves
On November 14, 2019, Smith signed a three-year contract with the Atlanta Braves worth $39 million, with a club option for a fourth year.

On July 4, 2020, it was announced that Smith had tested positive for COVID-19. He returned to baseball-related activities on July 26, and was placed on the Braves' active roster on August 6.

In 2020, he was 2–2 with a 4.50	ERA in 18 relief appearances covering 16 innings. On October 16, during Game 5 of the 2020 National League Championship Series (NLCS) Smith became the first MLB pitcher to face a position player of the same name in the postseason, Los Angeles Dodgers catcher Will Smith. The faceoff ended with Smith surrendering a three-run home run to the Dodgers' Smith.

In 2021, Smith was 3–7 with 37 saves and a 3.44 ERA in 71 relief appearances covering 68 innings.  The Braves clinched a playoff berth, and in an NLCS rematch versus the Dodgers, he was 2–0 with no runs allowed.  Smith closed out Game 6 of the World Series versus the Houston Astros, which Atlanta won to clinch the title.  He notably did not surrender any runs in the entire postseason over 11 appearances, going 2–0 with six saves.

Houston Astros
The Braves traded Smith to the Houston Astros for Jake Odorizzi on August 2, 2022.  Smith made his Astros debut the following day versus the Boston Red Sox, allowing a solo home run in an otherwise clean ninth inning.  The Astros advanced to the World Series and defeated the Philadelphia Phillies in six games to give Smith his second World Series title in two seasons.

The Astros declined Smith's option for 2023, thereby making him a free agent.

Texas Rangers
On March 4, 2023, Smith signed a one-year contract with the Texas Rangers.

Personal life
Smith and his wife, Taylor, married in November 2020 in Atlanta.

References

External links

1989 births
Living people
People from Newnan, Georgia
Sportspeople from the Atlanta metropolitan area
Major League Baseball pitchers
National League All-Stars
Kansas City Royals players
Milwaukee Brewers players
San Francisco Giants players
Atlanta Braves players
Houston Astros players
Orem Owlz players
Cedar Rapids Kernels players
Wilmington Blue Rocks players
Gulf Coast State Commodores baseball players
Rancho Cucamonga Quakes players
Arkansas Travelers players
Salt Lake Bees players
Northwest Arkansas Naturals players
Omaha Storm Chasers players